The 2019 Kategoria e Tretë was the 16th official season of the Albanian football fourth division since its establishment. The season began on 22 February 2019. There were 6 teams competing this season. Selenica and Mirdita gained promotion to the 2019–20 Kategoria e Dytë. Selenica won their first Kategoria e Tretë title.

Changes from last season

Team changes

From Third Division
Promoted to Kategoria e Dytë:
 Term

Stadia by capacity and locations

League standings

References

4
Albania
Kategoria e Tretë seasons